The 1964–65 West Midlands (Regional) League season was the 65th in the history of the West Midlands (Regional) League, an English association football competition for semi-professional and amateur teams based in the West Midlands county, Shropshire, Herefordshire, Worcestershire and southern Staffordshire.

At the end of the season the second division was introduced. It was made up largely of reserve sides of non-league clubs, the majority of which were in the league’s new ‘Premier Division’.

Clubs
The league featured 18 clubs from the previous season, along with one new club:
Walsall reserves

Also, Sutton Town changed name to Sutton Coldfield Town and Stratford Town changed name to Stratford Town Amateurs.

League table

References

External links

1964–65
W